"The Dog" is the 21st episode of Seinfeld. The episode was the fourth episode of the show's third season. It was written by series co-creator Larry David and first aired on October 9, 1991.

Plot
Jerry is on a plane returning to New York City when a drunk man, Gavin Polone, seated next to him falls sick. Gavin asks Jerry to take care of his dog Farfel while he is admitted to the hospital. He promises to reclaim the dog when he comes to New York. The dog infuriates Jerry with its constant barking and making messes. Jerry feels as though he does not dare leave his apartment, for fear of what Farfel might do.

Jerry, George and Elaine have plans to see the movie Prognosis Negative, but Jerry asks them to go without him because of the dog. George and Elaine realize they do not have much in common without Jerry around; they begin to have good conversation only when they start making fun of Jerry.

Kramer tells Jerry and Elaine he is looking forward to breaking up with his girlfriend, Ellen, because she is such a vile human being. Jerry and Elaine reveal that they agree with his assessment of her personality and only kept quiet about it for fear of offending him. Kramer indeed breaks up with Ellen in a melodramatic fashion—and shortly after reunites in the same fashion. He then holds a grudge against Jerry and Elaine for their earlier derisive remarks about Ellen, announcing an end to their friendship. When Kramer and Ellen break up again, Jerry and Elaine tell Kramer they are disappointed by the breakup, having learned their lesson.

Jerry, tired of having to put up with Farfel, tries to contact Gavin, but finds out that he checked out of the hospital several days ago. He decides to take the dog to the city pound so that he, George and Elaine can go to the movies together. This upsets Elaine, who persuades him to let her stay with the dog for one more day while he and George go to the movies without her. Elaine's attitude towards the dog changes dramatically when she finds out how disobedient Farfel is. When Gavin finally calls, Elaine angrily tells him to come and collect Farfel or else he has "humped his last leg". Gavin claims he was diagnosed with Bell's Palsy, the reason he could not call earlier, and comes for the dog, much to the relief of Jerry and Elaine.

Production
In a deleted scene, Kramer reveals that he fed Farfel turkish taffy, which would have explained the dog's erratic behavior and frequent barking.

Cultural references
Farfel was named after the advertising icon Farfel the Dog.

Critical reception 

David Sims of The A.V. Club, giving a grade of B+, writes that the episode is "an amusingly over-the-top one, with not one but two unseen, horrible characters, and it's the first episode with those great fake Seinfeld movie names. ... We never see the dog, and since he's a satanic hound that barks constantly and chews everything he sees, it's all the funnier that we don't. The "evil dog" joke gets old quickly but it works just enough because Jerry's OCD tendencies are so profoundly disturbed by having the dog in his bedroom."

Legacy
Jerry delivers a monologue on people and dogs:
 

This has been quoted (and mis-quoted) enough to permeate the culture, approaching catchphrase standards.

References

External links 
 

Seinfeld (season 3) episodes
1991 American television episodes
Television episodes written by Larry David